The 1941 Idaho Southern Branch Bengals football team was an American football team that represented the University of Idaho, Southern Branch (later renamed Idaho State University) as an independent during the 1941 college football season. In their first season under head coach John Vesser, the team compiled a 5–1–2 record and outscored their opponents by a total of 138 to 53.

Schedule

Notes

References

External links
 1942 Wickiup athletic section — yearbook summary of the 1941 season

Idaho Southern Branch
Idaho State Bengals football seasons
Idaho Southern Branch Bengals football